The World Business Angels Association (WBAA) is an international, not-for-profit organization whose mission is to stimulate the exchange of knowledge and best practices in the field of global angel capital financing for high growth and innovative startups.

Based in Brussels, the WBAA was formed by leaders of twelve national business angel federations to create an international community of business angel networks and leaders for the promotion of innovation and entrepreneurship through the financing of high growth start-up companies with the support of business angels worldwide.

History
The organizational meeting of the WBAA was in Estoril, Portugal, on October 10, 2007
and was co-organized by Portuguese Business Angels Federation (FNABA), European Business Angels Network (EBAN) and US Angel Capital Association (ACA). A follow-up meeting of the organization's Charter Members was held on April 19, 2009 in Dubai, leading to the Inaugural World Business Angels Association Global Conference in Beijing, China on December 5–6, 2009.<ref
name=CBAA></ref>

Membership
WBAA is an NGO whose direct members are national federations,
which in turn represent business angel groups and networks in their respective countries. Neither business angel groups themselves, nor individual business angel investors, are members of WBAA, although they may be involved with the organization in other ways and participate actively in its programs. Countries whose national business angel federations are represented in the organization include Australia, Chile, China, France, Germany, India, Italy, New Zealand, Panama, Portugal, Scotland, Spain, United Arab Emirates, United Kingdom, and the United States, as well as the European Union.

Mission
The primary mission of the WBAA is to raise global awareness of the importance and practice of business angel investment, stimulate the exchange of best practices in angel investing, and  enhance the development of cross-border angel investing. It does this by promoting the professionalization of the angel market through the fostering of angel groups and associations; coordinating research produced on the angel market worldwide; standardizing terminology at an international level regarding angel investing; organizing in-person meetings and conferences for international angel investors; and developing online resources for information about, and access to, local, regional and cross-border angel investing resources.

See also 
 Angel investor

Notes

External links
 WBAA official site

Private equity
Venture capital